North Korea (Democratic People's Republic of Korea) competed in the 2008 Summer Olympics, held in Beijing, People's Republic of China from August 8 to August 24, 2008. The country sent 63 athletes, competing in 11 sports.

North and South Korea had initially intended to send a joint delegation to the Games, but were unable to agree on the details of its implementation. (see South Korea at the 2008 Summer Olympics)

Reportedly, North Korean athletes were barred by their government from mingling with other athletes at the Olympic Village, or from leaving the Village to sightsee.

Medalists

Archery

North Korea sent archers to the Olympics for the fifth time, after not qualifying any for the 2004 Games. Two North Korean women sought the nation's first Olympic medal in the sport. Kwon Un Sil and Son Hye-Yong earned the country two places in the women's individual competition by placing 9th and 24th, respectively, at the 2007 World Outdoor Target Championships.

Athletics

Men

Women

Boxing

North Korea qualified one boxer for the Olympic boxing tournament. Kim Song Guk qualified in the lightweight class at the 2007 World Championships.

Diving 

Men

Women

Football

Women's tournament

Roster

Group play

Gymnastics

Artistic
Women

Judo

North Korea will send six judoka to Beijing, including:

Men

Women

Shooting

North Korea will be represented by six shooters, including Kim Jong-su, who won bronze in the men's 50m pistol in Athens. Kim Jong-su, who originally won a silver medal in the men's 50 metre pistol and a bronze medal in the men's 10 metre air pistol, was tested positive for the banned substance of propranolol, and subsequently stripped off his medals.

Men

Women

Synchronized swimming

Table tennis

Weightlifting

Men

Women

Wrestling 

Men's freestyle

Men's Greco-Roman

External links
 "North Korea Heads for Best Olympics; Don't Say It in Pyongyang", Bloomberg, August 21, 2008
 "A lonely Olympics experience", The Oregonian, August 19, 2008

References

Korea, North
2008
Summer Olympics